Simon Peter Sserunkuma (born 19 September 1991) is a Ugandan professional footballer who plays for Simba SC in the Tanzanian Premier League.

Club career

Victors FC
He made his debut during the 2007 season in a game against Kampala City Council FC. During his time with Victors FC he won the 2008 Super League most valuable player and Uganda Cup in the same year.

SC Villa
He became the most expensive player in Ugandan history when SC Villa paid Victors FC 16 million shillings ($10,000) in May 2009.

International career
Sserunkuma made his national team debut for Bobby Williamson came in a 2–1 win over Malawi in 2009. In March 2010, his recovery from a hamstring injury to be available for the African Nations Championship (CHAN) qualifier against Burundi was crucial to the success of the National Team.

References

External links
 http://www.monitor.co.ug/Sports/Soccer/-/690266/884790/-/view/printVersion/-/eeb5mo/-/index.html

1991 births
Living people
Ugandan footballers
Expatriate footballers in Tanzania
Association football midfielders
Ugandan expatriate sportspeople in Tanzania
People from Kampala
Uganda international footballers
2011 African Nations Championship players
Uganda A' international footballers
Ugandan expatriate footballers
Simba S.C. players
Express FC players
SC Villa players